The men's ISSF 50 meter pistol was a shooting sports event held as part of the Shooting at the 1960 Summer Olympics programme. It was the tenth appearance of the event. The competition was held on 5 and 6 September 1960 at the Umberto I Shooting Range in Rome. 67 shooters from 40 nations competed. Nations had been limited to two shooters each since the 1952 Games. The event was won by Aleksey Gushchin of the Soviet Union, as the Soviet team finished 1–2 with Makhmud Umarov repeating as silver medalist (the third man to earn multiple medals in the event). Yoshihisa Yoshikawa (who would become the fourth multi-medalist four years later) of Japan took bronze.

Background

This was the 10th appearance of the ISSF 50 meter pistol event. The event was held at every Summer Olympics from 1896 to 1920 (except 1904, when no shooting events were held) and from 1936 to 2016; it was nominally open to women from 1968 to 1980, although very few women participated these years. A separate women's event would be introduced in 1984. 1896 and 1908 were the only Games in which the distance was not 50 metres; the former used 30 metres and the latter 50 yards.

Three of the top 10 shooters from the 1956 Games returned: gold medalist Pentti Linnosvuo of Finland, silver medalist Makhmud Umarov of the Soviet Union, and sixth-place finisher (and 1936 gold and 1948 bronze medalist and 1952 sixth-place finisher) Torsten Ullman of Sweden. 1952 silver medalist Ángel León Gozalo of Spain and bronze medalist Ambrus Balogh of Hungary also returned. Umarov was the reigning (1958) world champion, with fellow Soviet Aleksey Gushchin the runner-up.

The British West Indies, Hong Kong, Indonesia, Kenya, Luxembourg, Morocco, Poland, San Marino, Singapore, and Thailand each made their debut in the event; East and West Germany competed together as the United Team of Germany for the first time. The United States made its ninth appearance, most of any nation, having missed only the 1900 event.

Gushchin used a Izhmash Isch 1.

Competition format

The 1960 competition introduced a two-round format. In the first round, each shooter fired 40 shots, in 4 series of 10 shots each, at 50 metres. The top 27 shooters in each of the two qualifying groups advanced to the final. The final had each shooter fire 60 shots, in 6 series of 10 shots each, at a distance of 50 metres.

The target was round, 50 centimetres in diameter, with 10 scoring rings. Scoring for each shot was up to 10 points, in increments of 1 point. The maximum score possible in the final was 600 points. Any pistol was permitted. Shoot-offs were held to break ties for top ranks.

Records

Prior to this competition, the existing world and Olympic records were as follows.

The 24-year old Olympic record fell to Aleksey Gushchin, who beat it by 1 point with his final round of 560.

Schedule

Results

Qualifying

Group 1

Group 2

Final

References

Shooting at the 1960 Summer Olympics
Men's 1960